is a Japanese composer, arranger and synthesizer programmer, best known for his work on Street Fighter IV.

Career 
Fukasawa began learning piano when he was in elementary school. At the age of 10, he listened to the soundtrack of the anime film Swan Lake, which led him to be influenced by the Russian composer Pyotr Ilyich Tchaikovsky. When in high school, Fukasawa began playing synthesizer, guitar, bass and drums. In 1991, he started his career as a synthesizer programmer. Since then, he has been involved in many works, mainly composing and arranging music for video game and anime. Fukusawa worked on the 2003 game Onimusha 2: Samurai's Destiny under lead composer Taro Iwashiro, sampling various traditional Japanese instruments for the soundtrack. His involvement in Onimusha 2 led to him being chosen as composer for Chaos Legion, which released the same year. Fuksawa would later serve as the in-game composer for Onimusha: Dawn of Dreams, which released in 2006, with Jamie Christopherson composing for the cutscenes. Fukasawa was influenced by Taro Iwashiro's compositions for Onimusha 2, and sought to create strong and rich melodies.

Fukasawa served as composer for  Street Fighter IV, which released in 2009. Under the supervision of sound director Masayuki Endou, Fukasawa sought to modernise the music, with instrumental choices influenced by the cultural backgrounds of characters and stages. The arranging of old character themes put Fuksawa under pressure, as he was concerned on the arrangements' reception. Fukasawa composed for Tsukihime -A piece of blue glass moon- with Keita Haga, which released in August 2021. Fukasawa was approached following the production of Witch on the Holy Night, with Keita presenting him a demo of the main theme, which he then arranged. Fukasawa sought to create a soundtrack based on the keywords  "urban," "modern", and "mysterious."  He began by setting a tone, followed by adding layers to create a sonic palette and add depth.

Works

Anime

Video games

References

Shin Onimusha Special Pack Soundtrack

External links 
 
 Hideyuki Fukasawa anime at Media Arts Database 
 Hideyuki Fukasawa at Oricon 

Anime composers
Capcom people
Japanese composers
Japanese film score composers
Japanese male composers
Japanese male film score composers
Japanese male musicians
Living people
Musicians from Tokyo
Video game composers
1970 births